Stratonis was a fort in the Roman province of Moesia. As Tabula Peutingeriana shows it is situated between Callatis and Tomis; 22 miles from Callatis and 12 miles from Tomis.

See also
List of castra

External links
Roman castra from Romania - Google Maps / Earth

Notes

Roman legionary fortresses in Romania
History of Dobruja